This is the progression of world record improvements of the 800 metres M40 division of Masters athletics.

Key

References

Masters athletics world record progressions